Take Home Nanny is an hour-long reality show. It originally aired on TLC.

The show features professional nanny Emma Jenner whose basic approach instills manners, encourages boundaries and discipline.

Format

In each episode, Jenner visits the home of families across America helping them instill some order within their households.

Jenner introduces herself to a family at their home. The family identify a forthcoming event in which Jenner needs to get the children ready for. She spends a day observing both the parents and children to identify their problems. Jenner works closely with the family, giving them the advice and tools necessary to fix undesirable behavior, bringing harmony into the home. Jenner's work is put to the test at the big family event.

Episode Guide

See also
Supernanny, a similar British and American series.

References

External links
 Official site
 
 Cleveland.com

TLC (TV network) original programming
2000s American reality television series
2008 American television series debuts
2008 American television series endings
Works about child care occupations

zh:帥哥廚師到我家